Robert Sharp Robinson (10 November 1950 – 24 December 1996) was a Scottish international footballer, who played as a midfielder. Beginning his career with Falkirk, Robinson went on to spend around half his career with Dundee, winning four caps for Scotland during his time at Dens Park. Later playing for city rivals Dundee United, Robinson moved on to Hearts and Raith Rovers, ending his senior career with Raith in 1983. Robinson played just under 300 league matches during his fourteen-year career.

In 1989, he joined Dundee United's reserve team to help develop the team's younger players. After his football career, Robinson was a teacher in Kirriemuir and Brechin. He died after a long illness in 1996 at the age of 46.

References

External links 
 
 

1950 births
1996 deaths
Footballers from Edinburgh
Scotland international footballers
Scottish footballers
Falkirk F.C. players
Dundee F.C. players
Dundee United F.C. players
Heart of Midlothian F.C. players
Raith Rovers F.C. players
Scottish Football League players
Scottish Junior Football Association players
Newtongrange Star F.C. players
Scotland under-23 international footballers
Dundee United F.C. non-playing staff
Association football midfielders
Place of death missing